Celleno is a comune (municipality) of 1 297 inhabitants in the Province of Viterbo in the Italian region Lazio, located about  northwest of Rome and about  north of Viterbo. It was the site of the first battle by South African troops in Italy during the Second World War.

Notable people
Giacinto Achilli

References

Cities and towns in Lazio